Echidgnathia is a genus of moths in the family Sesiidae.

Species
Echidgnathia khomasana de Freina, 2011
Echidgnathia vitrifasciata (Hampson, 1910)

References

Sesiidae